The National Union of Postal and Telecommunication Employees (NUPTE) is a trade union representing workers in the communication industry in Nigeria.

The union was founded in 1978, when the Government of Nigeria merged seven unions:

 Association of Posts and Telegraph Draughtsmen
 P. and T. Clerical and Allied Workers' Union
 P. and T. Telephonists' Union of Nigeria
 Postal Staff Workers' Union of Nigeria
 Posts and Telegraphs Engineering Workers' Union
 Posts and Telegraphs Typists' Stenographers' Union of Nigeria
 Union of Posts and Telecommunication Workers of Nigeria

The union was a founding affiliate of the Nigeria Labour Congress, and by 1988 it had 29,000 members.  Its membership rose slightly to 30,000 in 1995, but fell to only 8,000 by 2005.

External links

References

Communications trade unions
Trade unions established in 1978
Trade unions in Nigeria